School Daze: Original Soundtrack Album is the music soundtrack album to Spike Lee's 1988 film School Daze. The soundtrack peaked at number 14 on the Billboard Top R&B Albums chart. The soundtrack features the songs "Da Butt" by E.U. and "Be Alone Tonight" which features Tisha Campbell. "Da Butt" became a number-one R&B/pop hit on the Billboard R&B Singles chart and peaked at number 35 on the Billboard Hot 100.

Track listing

Source

Credits
Executive producer — Spike Lee
Producers — Marcus Miller (track 1), Lenny White (track 2), Raymond Jones (track 3), Bill Lee (tracks 4, 5, 6, 8, 9, 10), Stevie Wonder (track 7)

Charts

Singles

References

1988 soundtrack albums
EMI Records soundtracks
Musical film soundtracks
Comedy film soundtracks
Drama film soundtracks